Charles Mathiesen (12 February 1911 – 7 November 1994) was a speed skater who was active from 1930 to 1948.

Biography
Mathiesen was born in Drammen, Norway. Skating for Drammens Skøyteklubb (Drammen's Skating Club – the same club Ivar Ballangrud represented for a while), Charles Mathiesen made his international debut in 1933, finishing eighth at the World Allround Championships. The following year, Mathiesen won his first medal when he took the silver at the Norwegian Allround Championships (held at his hometown of Drammen) behind Michael Staksrud. Mathiesen won the Norwegian Allround Championships, being the "eternal runner-up" behind skaters like Ballangrud, Staksrud, Hans Engnestangen, and a few more, winning silver a total number of six times.

The season after winning his first medal, Mathiesen participated in the 1936 Winter Olympics in Garmisch-Partenkirchen and became Olympic Champion on the 1,500 m. He skated a new Olympic record on that distance, but did not beat the world record set by Oscar Mathisen 22 year earlier. However, he turned out to be the only skater who was able to beat his teammate Ivar Ballangrud during those Olympics and thereby the only one to keep Ballangrud from winning Olympic gold on all four distances.

More national and international successes followed, including becoming European Allround Champion in 1938 and – at the World Allround Championships two weeks after that – coming very close to breaking the world record on the 10,000 m. However, he was paired against Ballangrud in his 10,000 m race, and although both finished in the same time of 17:14.4, Ballangrud was declared the winner and therefore also became the new world record holder. Times were measured to a precision of only one tenth of a second in those days and so a time of 17:14.4 on the 10,000 m – an average speed of 9.57 m/s – meant that one skater could finish almost one meter (a little over three feet) behind another skater and still have the same time. Two years later, he skated a world record in the 10,000 m, which stood for almost 9 years.

Mathiesen may have won more medals if it had not been for World War II. As a result of that war, the European Allround Championships were not held in the years 1940-1945, nor the World Allround Championships in the years 1940-1946. In fact, Mathiesen proved that he was (still) at the world top immediately before the war and immediately after the war by winning bronze at Unofficial World Championships held in 1940 and 1946. In those same years, he also won his last two silver medals at the Norwegian Allround Championships.

Twelve years after having won his 1,500 m Olympic gold medal, Mathiesen participated in the 5,000 m at the 1948 Winter Olympics in St. Moritz, but the relatively low oxygen levels at the ice rink there – located 1,856 m (6,089 ft) above sea level – caused him to have trouble breathing and 3,000 m into his 5,000 m race, he collapsed and was taken to a hospital.

Medals
An overview of medals won by Mathiesen at important championships he participated in, listing the years in which he won each:

World records
Over the course of his career, Mathiesen skated one world record:

Source: SpeedSkatingStats.com

Personal records
To put these personal records in perspective, the WR column lists the official world records on the dates that Mathiesen skated his personal records.

Mathiesen has an Adelskalender score of 189.345 points. His highest ranking on the Adelskalender was a second place.

References

External links

Charles Mathiesen at SpeedSkatingStats.com
Evert Stenlund's Adelskalender pages

1911 births
1994 deaths
World record setters in speed skating
Norwegian male speed skaters
Olympic speed skaters of Norway
Olympic gold medalists for Norway
Speed skaters at the 1936 Winter Olympics
Speed skaters at the 1948 Winter Olympics
Olympic medalists in speed skating
Medalists at the 1936 Winter Olympics
World Allround Speed Skating Championships medalists
Sportspeople from Drammen